Daniel Jelensperger (1 April 1799 – 30 May 1831) was a French musicologist.

Life 
Born in Mulhouse, Jelensperger studied with Anton Reicha at the Conservatoire de Paris where he later taught counterpoint and musical composition. In 1830 he published his harmony treaty L'harmonie au commencement du dix-neuvième siècle et méthode pour l'etudier in Paris, which was published in 1833 by Breitkopf & Härtel in Leipzig under the title Die Harmonie im Anfang des neunzehnten Jahrhunderts. His views were far more influenced by the German musical tradition as represented by Abbé Vogler and Weber than by contemporary French music.

Jelensperger died in Paris.

Bibliography 
 Lucien Chevaillier: Musiciens d'Alsace (XIXe siècle). Daniel Jelensperger et Henri Reber. In: Vie en Alsace, Vol. 1 (1923), Heft 2, 
 David Damschroder: Thinking about Harmony. Historical Perspectives on Analysis. Cambridge University Press, Cambridge 2008 , . 
 Allgemeine musikalische Zeitung,  N°. 32, August 1831

1799 births
1831 deaths
Writers from Mulhouse
Conservatoire de Paris alumni
Academic staff of the Conservatoire de Paris
19th-century French musicologists
19th-century French musicians
19th-century musicologists